Judith V. Samuel (born 2 August 1943, in Sri Lanka) is a retired British freestyle swimmer.

Swimming career
She won a silver medal in the 4 × 100 m relay at the 1958 European Aquatics Championships. At the 1960 Summer Olympics she was part of the British team that was fifth in the same event.

She represented England in the 440 yards freestyle at the 1958 British Empire and Commonwealth Games in Cardiff, Wales.

References

1943 births
Living people
British female swimmers
Swimmers at the 1960 Summer Olympics
British female freestyle swimmers
Olympic swimmers of Great Britain
British people of Sri Lankan descent
European Aquatics Championships medalists in swimming
Swimmers at the 1958 British Empire and Commonwealth Games
Commonwealth Games competitors for England